School feeding programs have been defined by the World Bank as "targeted social safety nets that provide both educational and health benefits to the most vulnerable children, thereby increasing enrollment rates, reducing absenteeism, and improving food security at the household level". Beyond improvements in access to food, school feeding programs also have a positive impact on nutritional status, gender equity, and educational status, each of which contributes to improving overall levels of country and human development.

While school meals are provided by the governments of most high and middle-income countries around the globe, the children who may benefit most from school feeding programs are in low-income countries that do not have government-provided school meals. School feeding in low-income countries often starts through funding by international organizations such as the United Nations World Food Programme or the World Bank or national governments through programs such as the McGovern-Dole International Food for Education and Child Nutrition Program. However, some governments have first started school-feeding programs and then requested the help of these organizations and programs. Additionally, many countries have "graduated" from their dependency on foreign assistance by reshaping their school feeding programs to be country-led and self-supported.

As of 2020, school feeding programs were found in at least 22 low-income countries and 33 lower middle-income countries. However, these programs can have limited reach within each country, and the aggregate school feeding coverage rate (the share of school-age children that receive food through school feeding programs) rises with higher levels of income. Across low-income countries, 10% of children benefit from school feeding programs, while this value is 27%, 30%, and 47% across lower middle-income, upper middle-income, and high-income countries, respectively. While school feeding programs are prevalent, they can vary widely in their design, implementation, and evaluation. Thus, literature reviews and studies often focus on a small number of countries, as it can be challenging to compare or assess programs in different settings.

Need for school feeding programs

According to the United Nations World Food Programme, 66 million primary school age children go hungry every day, with 23 million hungry children in Africa alone. Furthermore, 80% of these 66 million children are concentrated within just 20 countries. Additionally, 75 million school-age children (55% of them girls) do not attend school, with 47% of them living in sub-Saharan Africa. Thus, the need to reduce hunger while increasing school enrollment in these children is evident, and school feeding programs have been developed to target this multifaceted problem.

Schools have become a natural and convenient setting for the implementation of health and education interventions. School feeding is just one facet of school health initiatives, as other programs may include de-worming, HIV/AIDS prevention and education, and life and health skills education. Overall, school feeding programs have been shown to directly increase the educational and nutritional status of recipient children, and indirectly impact the economic and social lives of themselves and their family. Additionally, school feeding directly addresses the Millennium Development Goals (MDGs) of reducing hunger by one-half, achieving universal primary education, and achieving gender parity in education by 2015.

Types of school feeding programs

There are two main ways to distribute food through school feeding programs: on-site meals and take-home rations. On-site meals are foods that are distributed to children while at school during morning and afternoon meal and snack times, which may include a bowl of porridge or nutrient-fortified biscuits. Take-home rations are a collection of basic food items, such as a bag of rice and a bottle of cooking oil, which may be sent home and transferred to the families of children who regularly attend school.

While the food items needed for school feeding programs may be imported into the country from anywhere throughout the world, an increasing number of countries and organizations are looking to expand what is called "home-grown school feeding," which requires that provided food is produced and purchased within a country to the greatest extent possible. These programs provide an opportunity for children to receive improved nutrition and educational opportunities while also allowing smallholder farmers to benefit from access to a market with stable, structured, and predictable demand. The New Partnership for Africa's Development (NEPAD) guided governments in Sub-Saharan Africa to include home-grown school feeding as a critical intervention for the food security facet of the Comprehensive Africa Agriculture Development Programme (CAADP). Several countries, including Côte d'Ivoire, Ghana, Kenya, Mali and Nigeria, are currently taking part in home-grown school feeding programs.

Approaches to school feeding

Country involvement in school feeding programs

According to the International Food Policy Research Institute, there are five stages of school feeding. The first stage includes school feeding programs that rely mostly on external funding and implementation, while the last stage includes school feeding programs that rely mostly on internal government funding and implementation. Countries that are within the first stage include Afghanistan and Sudan, where country governments are unable to lead school feeding programs. Countries that are within the fifth stage include Chile and India, which have functional, country-led school feeding programs. For example, the Government of Chile has provided a school feeding program for over 40 years through the La Junta Nacional de Auxilio Escolar y Becas (National Board of School Assistance and Scholarships) through a public-private partnership. This program involves technology that allows food to be centrally mass-produced and then distributed across the country.  Additionally, the Government of India has supported school feeding programs since 2001, when the country recognized Indians' Constitutional Right to Food. Countries that are in the middle of the stages, such as Kenya and Ecuador may have some but not all of the governmental policies, financial capacities, or institutional capacities to operate school feeding programs without external funding or implementation.

Involvement of the World Food Programme

In terms of external funding and implementation, the United Nations World Food Programme (WFP) is the world's leading provider of school feeding program financial contributions and program development. WFP currently provides school feeding resources to an average of 22 million children in school, about half of whom are girls, across 70 countries. The total financial contribution for these programs is almost USD$500 million per year. Many governments work alongside WFP in school-feeding programs, though in countries where the government is non-functional or corrupt, WFP may work on its own or with other non-governmental organizations. The World Food Programme has estimated that US$3.2 billion is needed each year to feed the 66 million school-age children around the globe, an amount of US$50 per child.

WFP has been working with governments around the world for over 45 years, but is shifting from a food aid organization to food assistance organization, working to move away from "individual, isolated projects to more strategic and comprehensive approaches".  To foster government ownership of school meals, WFP has implemented eight quality standards that guide the design and implementation of sustainable school meal programs:
 A strategy for sustainability, 
 A national policy framework
 Stable funding and budgeting
 Needs-based, cost-effective quality programme design
 Strong institutional arrangements for implementation, monitoring, and accountability
 Strategy for local production and sourcing
 Strong partnerships
 Inter-sector coordination, and community participation and ownership.

Benefits of school feeding

Nutrition and food security
School meals have been shown to increase the nutritional status of school-age children in a variety of ways. For example, there is a notable reduction in malnutrition via diet diversification and an increased absorption of micronutrients. Overall, the amount of kilocalories in a child's diet is expanded when they are given nutritional resources that they would otherwise have little to no access to. By increasing the amount of nutrition a child receives at school, that child's family's nutrition status also increases as their familial demand and requirement for food is decreased. Targeted take-home rations therefore increase the nutrition of the family as a whole, and not just the members of a given family that are of primary-school age. However, criticisms of school meals' impacts on nutrition stem from the idea that increased nutrition through school meals is only a temporary fix and does not target the underlying causes of malnutrition, such as high food prices and poor food distribution systems that threaten food security.

Education

Education is a key component in school feeding programs and global development because overall, a more educated person has an increased amount of opportunities in life, earns more money, and has a higher standard of living than an uneducated individual. School meals greatly impact recipient children's education status by increasing school enrollment and attendance, decreasing drop-out rates, and improving cognitive abilities and learning achievements. Generally, sending children to a school in which school-meals are served offsets the financial and opportunity costs of schooling, and thus families are incentivized to send their children to school. Additionally, school feeding programs may serve as an incentive for students to go to school to receive food rather than missing out on food by staying home.  The increased nutrition status of children, as a result of school feeding programs, also enhances students' cognitive abilities and performance in school.

Gender equity
School feeding programs have the capacity to increase gender equity in access to education, which allows for gender equity across all spheres of social and economic life. There are a variety of reasons that girls' education is impacted by factors on both the supply and demand side of schooling. These include gender-stereotyped curriculum and teaching practices, increased risks for girls' safety outside of the house, socio-cultural practices that cause girls' education to hold a very low value, and school infrastructure that is not suitable for girls. Due to the combination of such barriers, girls are disproportionately affected by the direct and opportunity cost of schooling, which prevents girls from very poor households from attending school. Opportunity costs for girls' education include lost time that would otherwise be spent doing household chores and care work. School feeding programs reduce the costs of sending girls to school and allow for an increased number of girls to be sent to school by their families. Furthermore, improvements in female literacy that come from increased education have been linked to declining rates of fertility, increased economic opportunities, and other markers of female empowerment.

Drawbacks and challenges to school feeding

While school feeding programs have a variety of positive impacts, there are some possible negative impacts these programs can cause. For example, school feeding programs can increase the cost of schooling by requiring that communities provide fire-wood for cooking as well as other items such as fresh-fruit, vegetables, and condiments. Additionally, school cooks are less likely to be remunerated in lower income settings, and communities are often expected to provide people on a volunteer basis who can cook these meals and maintain stores of all of the required food products, as well as kitchens and other fundamentals of meal provision. By causing a variety of needs and requirements to increase in a given community, the net benefit to a community from school feeding programs may be reduced.

School feeding programs are very context-specific, and each community's program must be designed based on the demographics, geography, and other patterns within and outside of schools. For this reason, there are a variety of challenges that emerge in the creation and implementation of school feeding programs. A successful program requires that countries:
 Determine if school feeding is the most effective program to target needy children
 Define program goals and outcomes
 Select the type of food to serve
 Determine a food procurement method
 Plan for management, implementation, and monitoring within schools—and a variety of other concerns

Because school feeding programs are community-specific and require a great deal of planning, the sustainability of school feeding programs is a main point of concern for many countries. Countries are very limited on the demands placed on the staff, resources, and infrastructure required for school-feeding programs, and often have to rely on outside financial and personnel help to continue programs for a significant amount of time.

Impacts of school feeding programs in low-income countries

Though school feeding produces a variety of anticipated impacts, as mentioned above, much research and evaluation is being done to determine the results of school feeding programs in low-income countries. School feeding program results are often context-specific, but lessons from a variety of communities can help evaluate school feeding program effectiveness. Researchers at the International Food Policy Research Institute have critically assessed evidence from developing countries to define preliminary results of these programs.  These assessments found that the timing of meals is not a critical factor in the positive effects on learning and cognition, and thus take-home rations can perform as well as in-school meals, and that in-school meals may even disrupt learning.  In some settings, take-home rations are more cost-effective than in-school meals, and the study argued that some country programs may be optimized by focusing resources on take-home rations. Additionally, it was found that in the study setting, school attendance improved learning more significantly than nutrition status improvements, but that school feeding programs encouraged attendance and still have a positive net result on education levels. In a study done by Patrick J. McEwan, it was shown that there is no evidence that higher-calorie meals positively impact school enrollment and attendance, first-grade enrollment age and grade repetition, and fourth-grade test scores over average-calorie school feeding meals in Chile's national program.  Thus, McEwan's study suggested that Chilean policy, to produce significant positive results, should focus more on the nutritional composition of school meals, rather than caloric content alone.

See also
 Food security
 Malnutrition
 Sex differences in education

References

Food security
Academic meals